The 2018 Symetra Tour was a series of professional women's golf tournaments held from March through October 2018 in the United States. The Symetra Tour is the second-tier women's professional golf tour in the United States and is the "official developmental tour" of the LPGA Tour. It was previously known as the Futures Tour.

Schedule and results
The number in parentheses after winners' names show the player's total number of official money, individual event wins on the Symetra Tour including that event.

Source

Leading money winners
The top ten money winners at the end of the season gained fully exempt cards on the LPGA Tour for the 2019 season.

Source

See also
2018 LPGA Tour
2018 in golf

References

External links

Symetra Tour
Symetra Tour